Goran Stojanović (born 29 January 1966) is a Serbian handball coach and former player.

Club career
Over the course of his career that spanned almost three decades, Stojanović, a goalkeeper, played for Crvena zvezda (two spells), Zagreb, Partizan, Mepamsa San Antonio, Conquense, THW Kiel, VfL Bad Schwartau, HSV Hamburg, and SC DHfK Leipzig. He won numerous trophies at club level, including the EHF Cup with THW Kiel in the 1997–98 season.

International career
At international level, Stojanović represented Yugoslavia at the 1990 World Championship. He was also a member of the team that finished runners-up at the 1990 Goodwill Games, winning the silver medal. Later on, Stojanović competed for FR Yugoslavia, winning the bronze medal at the 1996 European Championship.

Coaching career
In April 2013, Stojanović was appointed as head coach of AMTV Hamburg for the 2013–14 season.

Honours
Zagreb
 Yugoslav Handball Championship: 1988–89, 1990–91
 Yugoslav Handball Cup: 1990–91
Crvena zvezda
 Handball Championship of FR Yugoslavia: 1995–96
 Handball Cup of FR Yugoslavia: 1995–96
THW Kiel
 Handball-Bundesliga: 1997–98, 1998–99
 DHB-Pokal: 1997–98, 1998–99
 DHB-Supercup: 1998
 EHF Cup: 1997–98
VfL Bad Schwartau
 DHB-Pokal: 2000–01
HSV Hamburg
 DHB-Pokal: 2005–06
 DHB-Supercup: 2006
 EHF Cup Winners' Cup: 2006–07

References

External links

 

1966 births
Living people
People from Kotor
Serbs of Montenegro
Yugoslav male handball players
Serbian male handball players
RK Crvena zvezda players
RK Zagreb players
RK Partizan players
SDC San Antonio players
THW Kiel players
Liga ASOBAL players
Handball-Bundesliga players
Expatriate handball players
Serbian expatriate sportspeople in Spain
Serbian expatriate sportspeople in Germany
Serbian handball coaches
Competitors at the 1990 Goodwill Games
Goodwill Games medalists in handball